The Daihatsu Ayla is a city car designed by Daihatsu and manufactured by Astra Daihatsu Motor in Indonesia since 2013, primarily developed for emerging markets. The Ayla has also been sold by Toyota (Daihatsu's parent company since 2016) as the Toyota Agya in Indonesia, South Africa, Tunisia and Americas (except North America), and the Toyota Wigo in the Philippines, Sri Lanka, Brunei and Vietnam through an OEM agreement. The car is also slightly reengineered and manufactured in Malaysia by Perodua as the Perodua Axia.

The first-generation Ayla and Agya were first unveiled at the 20th Indonesia International Motor Show in September 2012 and went on sale a year later, in September 2013. The second-generation models were unveiled in February 2023 and went on sale a month afterwards.

The name Ayla was taken from the Sanskrit word meaning 'light', while Agya means 'fast'. The name was chosen to comply with the Indonesian government-endorsed Low Cost Green Car (LCGC) tax exemption program which requires an Indonesian-inspired name. The program also requires for an Indonesian-inspired badge to be used, with the Ayla using an A-shaped front logo while the Agya for the Indonesian market opting for a Garuda-inspired front badge (except for the second-generation Agya GR Sport which is not eligible for the LCGC program).

First generation (B100; 2013) 

The first-generation Ayla and Agya was first announced and displayed at the 20th Indonesia International Motor Show in September 2012 as Daihatsu and Toyota's joint response to the Indonesian government's plan for the Low Cost Green Car (LCGC) program which eliminates luxury goods tax for eligible vehicles. The ratification of the LCGC program by the government was delayed by a year, which also delayed the mass production and market launch in September 2013. Early models were solely powered by a 998 cc 1KR-DE three-cylinder engine.

In 2014, Toyota Motor Philippines (TMP) introduced the car as the Toyota Wigo.

2017 facelift 
The first-generation Ayla and the Indonesian market Agya received their first facelift on 7 April 2017, with its development led by chief engineer Nobuhiko Ono. This facelift includes redesigned front and rear fascias (also with extended bonnet for 1.2-litre Ayla and all Agya variants), improved interior quality, among other improvements. The 1.0-litre Ayla variants retained the same headlights design from the previous version. The facelift also includes additional engine options: the 998 cc 1KR-VE three-cylinder engine with VVT-i (Agya only) and the 1.2-litre 3NR-VE four-cylinder engine with Dual VVT-i. The 1.0-litre Ayla variants kept the previous 1KR-DE engine.

The first facelift Wigo was launched on 10 May 2017.

2020 facelift 
The first-generation Ayla (1.2-litre variants) and the Indonesian market Agya received their second facelift on 19 March 2020. This facelift includes an updated front bumper design, redesigned side mirrors, digital air conditioner controls, among other improvements. The 1.0-litre Ayla variants retained the same design from the previous version. On 9 August 2021, the TRD S trim of the Indonesian market Agya was renamed to GR Sport. The 1.0-litre Agya variants were also removed as well in November 2021.

The second facelift Wigo was launched on 15 June 2020 in the Philippines.

Specifications

Ayla 
The Ayla is only available in Indonesia in eleven grade levels:
 1.0 D (only with 5-speed manual transmission without power steering, 2012–2023)
 1.0 D+ (only with 5-speed manual transmission, 2012–2023)
 1.0 M (with 5-speed manual and 4-speed automatic transmission, 2012–2020)
 1.0 M Sporty (with aero kits, 2013–2017)
 1.0 X (with 5-speed manual and 4-speed automatic transmission, 2012–2023)
 1.0 X Elegant (with aero kits, 2013–2017)
 1.0 X Deluxe (with aero kits, 2017–2023)
 1.0 X Airbag (with dual airbags, 2017–2020)
 1.2 X (with 5-speed manual and 4-speed automatic transmission, 2017–2023)
 1.2 R (with 5-speed manual and 4-speed automatic transmission, 2017–2023)
 1.2 R Deluxe (with aero kits, 2017–2023)

Pre-facelift

First facelift

Second facelift

Toyota Agya 
In Indonesia, the Agya was initially available in three grade levels: E, G and TRD S. Below are the complete breakdown of all grades:
 1.0 E (only with 5-speed manual transmission, 2012–2020)
 1.0 G (with 5-speed manual and 4-speed automatic transmission, 2012–2021)
 1.0 TRD S (with 5-speed manual and 4-speed automatic transmission, 2012–2017)
 1.2 G (with 5-speed manual and 4-speed automatic transmission, 2017–2023)
 1.2 TRD S (with 5-speed manual and 4-speed automatic transmission, 2017–2021)
 1.2 GR Sport (with 5-speed manual and 4-speed automatic transmission, 2021–2023)

Pre-facelift

First facelift

Second facelift

Toyota Wigo

Philippines 
In the Philippines, the Wigo comes in three grade levels:
 1.0 E (2014–present, only with 5-speed manual transmission)
 1.0 G (with 5-speed manual and 4-speed automatic transmission)
 1.0 TRD S (2020–present, only with 4-speed automatic transmission)

During Wigo's introduction, Toyota Motor Philippines launched an extensive marketing campaign for the car, featuring actors John Lloyd Cruz and Sarah Geronimo.

In the Philippines, the Wigo has been awarded Best Micro Car of the Year by the Car Awards Group for 2014–2015.

Sri Lanka 
In Sri Lanka, the Wigo is offered in 1.0 G and TRD S grade levels with only the automatic transmission available.

Brunei 
In Brunei, the Wigo is offered in sole 1.0 G grade with automatic transmission. It was launched in July 2015.

Vietnam 
The first facelift Wigo was launched in Vietnam in 2018. It is only offered in 1.2 G grade with 5-speed manual and 4-speed automatic transmission options.

Perodua Axia 

The Perodua Axia is a slightly reengineered version of the Ayla that was launched in Malaysia in 2014. It is only offered with a 1.0-litre engine.

Concept models

Ayla Turbo Concept 
The Ayla Turbo is a one-off concept car that was shown at the 26th Gaikindo Indonesia International Auto Show in August 2018, based on the 1.2-litre model. The two-tone red and black exterior colour is partially inspired from the 1984 Charade De Tomaso Turbo. The front and rear bumper design has also been redesigned. Further engine changes include the use of low-compression piston, dual fuel injector, open air filter and stronger connecting rod. The interior has been stripped down in order to gain lower weight and the roll cage has been added, along with FIA-certified Sparco racing bucket seats. The AC and other non-essential features have also been removed. The car made a claimed 0- acceleration in 10.3 seconds, 2.3 seconds faster than the standard car.

Ayla BEV Concept 

The Ayla BEV is an EV conversion prototype that was first presented at the 29th Gaikindo Indonesia International Auto Show on 11 August 2022. The suspension was made stronger due to the car being heavier than the regular ICE-powered model.

Second generation (A350; 2023) 

The second-generation Agya was unveiled in Indonesia on 13 February 2023, followed by the Ayla on 15 February. Sales were commenced at the 2nd Gaikindo Jakarta Auto Week on 10 March 2023. The cars shared the same DNGA-A platform with the A200 series Rocky crossover SUV, resulting in a longer body and wheelbase.

The development of the second-generation Ayla and Agya was paralleled with the second-generation Perodua Axia, and was led by chief engineer Toshihiro Nakaho from Daihatsu.

Powertrain updates include the 1.0-litre 1KR-VE (Ayla only) and the 1.2-litre WA-VE three-cylinder engines. Both engines are paired with either a 5-speed manual transmission or a Daihatsu-developed CVT, which is marketed by Daihatsu as "Dual-Mode CVT" (D-CVT).

The second-generation Ayla shared the same styling with the second-generation Axia, notably its front fascia and headlights. The Ayla is available in three grade levels: 1.0 M (only with 5-speed manual transmission), 1.0 X (with 5-speed manual and CVT) and 1.2 R (with 5-speed manual and CVT). Optional Astra Daihatsu Styling (ADS) package with aero kits and other accessories is also available for 1.0 X and 1.2 R grades.

The Indonesian market Agya is available in three grade levels: E, G and GR Sport, all powered by the 1.2-litre engine with 5-speed manual for all grades, and CVT for G and GR Sport grades. For the GR Sport grade, the Garuda-inspired front badge on the front grille was replaced by the regular Toyota emblem, and the "Astra Toyota" badging on the tailgate was removed. As a result, the grade is not eligible for LCGC regulations, resulting in an upmarket positioning. Aside from aero kits, the GR Sport grade also received specially tuned power steering programming, steering gear, shock absorbers and coil springs.

Sales 

As of February 2020, more than 214,000 units of Ayla had been sold in Indonesia. 278,465 units of Agya had also been sold as well.

Recall 
In September 2018, Toyota Motor Philippines issued a recall notice on over 15,000 Wigos produced from 5 April to 15 December 2017. The affected units have a faulty engine wire that may break from engine vibration, resulting in a decrease in engine power and a warning light illumination.

References

External links 

  (Ayla; Indonesia)
  (Agya; Indonesia)
  (Wigo; Philippines)

Ayla
Cars introduced in 2012
2020s cars
City cars
Hatchbacks
Front-wheel-drive vehicles
Vehicles with CVT transmission